Osmia albiventris, also known has the white-bellied mason bee, is a species of bee native to Canada. It belongs to the genus Osmia and the family Megachilidae. Like most Osmia bees it is a solitary bee.

References

albiventris